Preungesheim is a quarter of Frankfurt am Main, Germany. It is part of the Ortsbezirk Nord-Ost.

References

Districts of Frankfurt